Glen Ellyn is a village in DuPage County, Illinois, United States. A suburb located  due west of downtown Chicago, the village has a population of 28,846 as of the 2020 Census.

History

Glen Ellyn, like the neighboring town to the east, Lombard, had its genesis in an 1833 claim by two brothers from the Finger Lakes region of New York, Morgan and Ralph Babcock. The two claimed property in a large stand of timber near present-day St. Charles Road and the East Branch of the DuPage River. The brothers also arranged for a claim for their New York neighbor Deacon Winslow Churchill, who arrived in 1834 along with some of his adult children and their families. The nascent settlement became known as Babcock's Grove, and it included property currently part of both Glen Ellyn and Lombard.

Up the trail from the river to the west was a five-cornered intersection. In 1835, Daniel Fish built a cabin there, and other settlers followed. By the 1840s the intersection was called Fish's Corners and held a general store, blacksmith's forge, shops selling or repairing wagons and harnesses, and a Baptist church.

Moses Stacy, a soldier in the War of 1812, arrived  in 1835 and build a house south of Fish's Corners. In 1846, Stacy built at the five corners an inn, Stacy's Tavern, to serve as a halfway stop between Chicago and the Fox River Valley and a probable stop for Galena, Illinois stagecoaches on their way to Rockford, Illinois. Stacy's Tavern, now a historical monument, stands at what is now the intersection of Geneva Road and Main Street.

In 1849, construction of the Galena and Chicago Union Railroad through Glen Ellyn was finished. The railroad was about a mile south of the corners. At first, trains running through the town on the railway did not stop there. A local landowner, Dr. Lewey Quitterfield Newton, made an offer to the railroad company: Newton would provide land for a right-of-way and build a depot and water tank if the railroad would require trains to stop there. The depot that Newton built became known as Newton Station, and the locus of the community shifted to the area around the station.

The first church, a Congregational church, was built in 1862. Many Protestant churches were built in the village in the years to come. It was not until 60 years later that the first Catholic church was built.

The growing settlement went through several names, including Babcock's Grove, DuPage Center, Stacy's Corners, Newton's Station, Danby (after Danby, Vermont, a local landowner's birthplace) and Prospect Park. The current Glen Ellyn is based on the Welsh version of the name of the then–village president Thomas E. Hill's wife Ellen, preceded by glen, referring to the local geography.

The name Glen Ellyn had been adopted by 1889, when village president Hill and businessman Philo Stacy spearheaded a project to create a new lake, called Lake Glen Ellyn (today's Lake Ellyn), by having a dam built in a nearby stream.

In 1890, residents discovered mineral springs near the village. This contributed to Glen Ellyn advertising itself as Chicago's newest suburb and health resort, soon followed by the Village of Glen Ellyn being officially incorporated on May 10, 1892. The large Lake Glen Ellyn Hotel opened in 1892, the same year much of the business district was destroyed by fire. Fourteen years later, the hotel was struck by lightning and burned to the ground.

The village's all-volunteer fire department was created in 1907. By the end of the 20th century, it was the last all-volunteer fire department in DuPage County.

By World War I, Glen Oak Country Club served the Oak Park and Glen Ellyn communities, and in 1922 the first Glenbard high school was built.

Geography
The Village of Glen Ellyn is a suburb of Chicago, and it lies about  due west of downtown Chicago.

Demographics
As of the 2020 census there were 28,846 people, 10,747 households, and 7,529 families residing in the village. The racial makeup of the village was 78.75% White, 3.32% African American, 0.23% Native American, 8.16% Asian, 0.04% Pacific Islander, 2.77% from other races, and 6.73% from two or more races. Hispanic or Latino of any race were 7.47% of the population.

There were 10,747 households, out of which 67.74% had children under the age of 18 living with them, 61.55% were married couples living together, 6.63% had a female householder with no husband present, and 29.94% were non-families. 26.84% of all households were made up of individuals, and 14.47% had someone living alone who was 65 years of age or older. The average household size was 3.17 and the average family size was 2.58.

The village's age distribution consisted of 26.6% under the age of 18, 6.5% from 18 to 24, 22.3% from 25 to 44, 27% from 45 to 64, and 17.8% who were 65 years of age or older. The median age was 41.0 years. For every 100 females, there were 96.6 males. For every 100 females age 18 and over, there were 97.6 males.

The median income for a household in the village was $118,208, and the median income for a family was $169,358. Males had a median income of $90,561 versus $44,196 for females. The per capita income for the village was $65,328. About 2.2% of families and 4.6% of the population were below the poverty line, including 2.3% of those under age 18 and 1.7% of those age 65 or over.

Economy
According to Glen Ellyn's 2021 Comprehensive Annual Financial Report, the top employers in the city are:

Transportation
Glen Ellyn is served by the Metra Union Pacific/West Line. The Glen Ellyn station is located at 551 Crescent Blvd, near the heart of the downtown business district.

Glen Ellyn is served by Pace bus routes 714, 715, and 301 passing through the village on Roosevelt Road.

The Illinois Prairie Path bicycle trail bisects the village and the Great Western Trail (Illinois) passes through the northern edge.

At the east end of the village, Roosevelt Road provides access onto Interstate 355.

Notable people

Glen Ellyn Park District 
Glen Ellyn Park District was established on November 3, 1919 as a government agency for the community of Glen Ellyn. The facility was made to provide recreational activities such as, sports, dance, childcare and more. The park district provides more than 700 programs and is open all year round. The park district's year is divided into three seasons: Fall, Winter and Spring/Summer. It has 30 parks that are maintained for the community's use in both recreational and for programmed events like youth football and softball. The district counts with one outdoor aquatic facility Sunset Pool, four recreation buildings, 23 multipurpose parks and playgrounds and two lakes, including Ackerman Sports & Fitness Center and the Lake Ellyn Boathouse. The Park District launches other events like Taste of Glen Ellyn which is a great way to kick off the summer in town and surrounding areas. On Fourth of July the park district puts together a firework show in Lake Ellyn for everyone in the community, also counts with a Fourth of July parade that goes around the streets of the historic downtown Glen Ellyn.

Ackerman Sports Center 
The Ackerman Sports Center is located in Glen Ellyn, Illinois it counts with an indoor track, indoor field house, indoor turf soccer field, rock climbing wall, locker rooms and a fitness center. It provides a safe environment for those who are members to the facility, it counts with a variety of activities for children and adults. It also counts with childcare hours for fitness members.

Spring Avenue Recreation Center 
The Spring Avenue Recreation Center often referred as "SARC" services as one of the main facilities in the Glen Ellyn Park District. The building counts with a fitness center, fitness studio, dance studios, tumbling/gymnastics facility and a crafts lab. The SARC is also host of the Glen Ellyn Park District's Board of Commissioners meetings.  Offering a variety of activities for early childhood, youth and seniors, the Spring Avenue Center is the main hub of the Glen Ellyn Park District, located behind the SARC facility is a fully enclosed dog park.

Main Street Recreation Center 
The formerly Main Street School is also one of the main registration facilities in the Glen Ellyn Park District, it counts with surrounding park as a playground, large open play area, athletic fields, one official-sized baseball field, two dance studios, an indoor gymnasium and multi purpose rooms. The MSRC is also home to the offices of Anima - Glen Ellyn Children's Chorus.

Sunset Pool Aquatic Center 
Sunset Pool is a summer get away with fun and refreshing activities for early childhood, youth/adults and seniors. It counts with an outdoor, zero depth features as sloping, beach style entry as a well as the sand play area perfect for non-swimming children. It counts with water slides and a concession stand with in the facility. The sunset pool offers a variety of events from BBQ's to back to school bashes and special event rentals.

Popular culture
 Glen Ellyn is the setting for then-local resident O. T. Nelson's 1975 novel The Girl Who Owned a City. The protagonist, named Lisa Nelson after the author's real daughter, lives in the Lake Ellyn area of the village. After a virus kills all adults on the planet, she, with several other children, moved into Glenbard West High School.

 Glen Ellyn and Glenbard West High School were used as the setting in the movie Lucas (1986), starring Corey Haim and featuring the film debuts of Winona Ryder and Courtney Thorne-Smith.  The Fox Network's 1991 documentary/reality show Yearbook was filmed At Glenbard West.  Glen Ellyn was also used in June 2007 for filming of the movie Witless Protection (2008), featuring Larry the Cable Guy.

 Glen Ellyn is the home of the fictional character Joe Patroni, the TWA engineer in the novel Airport and played by George Kennedy in the four movies of the Airport franchise.

 Episode 4 of Guillermo del Toro's Cabinet of Curiosities, titled The Outside, is set in Glen Ellyn.

Education

Higher education
The main campus of College of DuPage is located in Glen Ellyn. Among its alumni are the comedian John Belushi and his actor brother James Belushi.

Public schools
Glen Ellyn's primary schools are part of Glen Ellyn School District 41  and Community Consolidated School District 89 . Its high schools are a part of Glenbard Township High School District 87, with the term Glenbard being a blend of Glen Ellyn and Lombard, a village due east of Glen Ellyn.

High schools
Glenbard West High School
Glenbard South High School
Middle schools
Glen Crest Middle School
Hadley Junior High School
Elementary schools
Abraham Lincoln Elementary School
Arbor View Elementary School
Benjamin Franklin Elementary School
Churchill Elementary School
Forest Glen Elementary School 
Park View Elementary School
Westfield Elementary School

Private schools
Montessori Academy of Glen Ellyn
Phillip J. Rock Center and School
St. James the Apostle Catholic School
St. Petronille Catholic School
Maryknoll Montessori School

Sister cities 
 Calatayud, Aragón, Spain
 Le Bouscat, Gironde, France

See also
Glen Oak Country Club

References

External links 

 

 
1834 establishments in Illinois
Populated places established in 1834
Villages in DuPage County, Illinois
Villages in Illinois